Carl Gunnar Gundersen (born 1 September 1967) is a Norwegian former ice hockey player. He was born in Stavanger, Norway. He played for the Norwegian national ice hockey team at the 1992 Winter Olympics.

References

External links

1967 births
Living people
Ice hockey players at the 1992 Winter Olympics
Norwegian ice hockey players
Olympic ice hockey players of Norway
Sportspeople from Stavanger